Milagres de Jesus (English: The Miracles of Jesus) is a Brazilian television series produced and broadcast by RecordTV. It premiered on January 22, 2014 and ended on February 24, 2015. It was the fifth biblical miniseries produced by RecordTV, succeeding José do Egito. Each episode of the series, had an estimated cost of R$900,000.

Synopsis 
Thrilling stories are presented, with captivating plots about the struggles biblical characters are confronted with. Each episode seeks to give teachings of love, hope, courage and perseverance from people who, through faith, received the Miracles Of Jesus.

Cast 
 Flávio Rocha as Jesus
 Caio Junqueira as Simão
 Marcello Gonçalves as André
 Maurício Ribeiro as Tiago
 Rodrigo Vidigal as João
 Pierre Santos as Mateus
 Pedro Coelho as Tomé
 Diogo Cardoso as Judas

Episodes

Season 1 (2014)

Season 2 (2015)

Broadcast 
The first season had 18 episodes shown on Wednesdays at 9:45 p.m. (BRT/AMT)  from January 22 to June 23, 2014. This season was re-run between January 5 and January 29, 2015 from Monday to Thursday at 10:30 p.m. (BRT/AMT). The second and last season was shown between February 2 to February 24, 2015 from Monday to Thursday at 10:30 p.m. (BRT/AMT).

In the United States it aired on MundoMax from September 29, 2015 to November 16, 2015. Univision also aired the series from June 4, 2017 to July 23, 2017.

Rating

References

External links 
  
 

2014 telenovelas
Brazilian telenovelas
RecordTV miniseries
Portuguese-language telenovelas
2014 Brazilian television series debuts
2015 Brazilian television series endings